Favoni, also known as Dr. Charles and William Shakespeare Harris House, is a historic home located near Poplar Tent, Cabarrus County, North Carolina. The two-story log section was built about 1791, with a two-story frame addition forming an "L" shaped dwelling, about 1840. The original section has Georgian / Federal style design elements and the later section has Greek Revival style design elements.

It was listed on the National Register of Historic Places in 1986.

References

Houses on the National Register of Historic Places in North Carolina
Greek Revival architecture in North Carolina
Federal architecture in North Carolina
Georgian architecture in North Carolina
Houses completed in 1791
Houses in Cabarrus County, North Carolina
National Register of Historic Places in Cabarrus County, North Carolina